Dániel Prosser (born 15 June 1994) is a Hungarian football player who plays as an attacking midfielder for MTK Budapest FC.

Club statistics

Updated to games played as of 22 August 2021.

References

External links
MLSZ

1994 births
Living people
Hungarian people of German descent
Footballers from Budapest
Hungarian footballers
Association football midfielders
Hungary youth international footballers
Hungary under-21 international footballers
Nemzeti Bajnokság I players
Liga I players
Budapest Honvéd FC players
Puskás Akadémia FC players
Sepsi OSK Sfântu Gheorghe players
Diósgyőri VTK players
MTK Budapest FC players
SønderjyskE Fodbold players
Hungarian expatriate footballers
Hungarian expatriate sportspeople in Romania
Hungarian expatriate sportspeople in Denmark
Expatriate footballers in Romania
Expatriate men's footballers in Denmark
Danish Superliga players